Manjhand Sindhi (مانجهند) Urdu (مانجھند) is a town in Jamshoro District, Sindh, Pakistan. The Manjhand railway station is also close to Manjhand town. Manjhand town has been given a status of Tehsil of Jamshoro District and town committee.

References

Populated places in Jamshoro District